John Ramsay (1814 – 24 Jun 1892)  was a Scottish distiller, merchant and Liberal Party politician.

Ramsay was the son of Robert Ramsay of Stirling and his wife Elizabeth Stirling. He was educated at Glasgow University and became a merchant in Glasgow. He was granted a lease in 1836 on the struggling Port Ellen whisky distillery on the island of Islay in the Inner Hebrides. He enlarged and improved the pier at Port Ellen in 1881 and became one of the pioneers of the export trade in Scotch whisky to the United States. He also inaugurated the first bi-weekly cargo and passenger service by steamship between Islay and Glasgow. He helped to improve the island's infrastructure and built Kildalton Castle, a rambling Scottish baronial country house in Port Ellen.

He was a Deputy Lieutenant and a J.P. for Argyllshire and a J.P. for Lanarkshire and showed a major interest in education.  In 1864 he was  a member of the Royal Commission on Education in Scotland, being also an unpaid member of Board of Education for Scotland. He was  a Fellow or member of several learned societies.

In April 1868, Ramsay was elected at a by-election as the Member of Parliament (MP) for Stirling Burghs when his predecessor gave up the seat under the influence of a spiritualist prophet. He only sat until the general election in November that year, when he lost the seat to the future prime minister Henry Campbell-Bannerman.  Ramsay was a member of the Royal Commission on Endowed Schools in Scotland in 1872. In the 1874 general election, he was elected as the MP for Falkirk Burghs, but discovering he had been in breach of regulations as he held a government contract at the time, stood down in March  and was re-elected at a by-election that month.  He held the seat until 1886, and in the meantime was a member of Endowed Institutions Commission under an Act of 1878, and of Educational Endowments Commission under an Act of 1882.

Ramsay lived at Kildalton, Argyllshire. He died at the age of 78.

Ramsay married firstly  Eliza, Shields of  Lanchester, Durham in 1857. She died in 1864, and he married again in 1871 to Lucy Martin of Auchendennan, Dumbarton.

References

External links 

1814 births
1892 deaths
Scottish Liberal Party MPs
Members of the Parliament of the United Kingdom for Scottish constituencies
UK MPs 1865–1868
UK MPs 1874–1880
UK MPs 1880–1885
UK MPs 1885–1886
Deputy Lieutenants of Argyllshire
Scottish merchants
Alumni of the University of Glasgow
Members of the Parliament of the United Kingdom for Stirling constituencies
19th-century Scottish businesspeople